The 12th Pan American Games were held in Mar del Plata, Argentina from March 11 to March 25, 1995.

Medals

Gold

Men's Flyweight (– 51 kg): Joan Guzmán

Silver

Men's Flyweight (– 56 kg): Luis Vizcaíno

Bronze

Men's Bantamweight (– 54 kg): John Nolasco
Men's Featherweight (– 57 kg): Luis Ernesto José
Men's Light Heavyweight (– 81 kg): Gabriel Hernández

Women's Middleweight (– 66 kg): Dulce Piña

Men's Heavyweight (+ 83 kg): Julio Vázquez

Results by event

See also
 Dominican Republic at the 1996 Summer Olympics

Nations at the 1995 Pan American Games
P
1995